Coleophora aelleniae is a moth of the family Coleophoridae. It is found in Uzbekistan.

The larvae feed on Halothamnus subaphyllus. They create a leafy case, consisting of one or two and rarely three sections. The valve is three-sided and formed at the end of development. The length of the case is 16–20 mm and it is chocolate-brown to yellow in color with one to three dark stripes. Larvae can be found from May to June. Fully fed larvae hibernate.

References

aelleniae
Moths described in 1972
Moths of Asia